This is a comprehensive list of songs recorded or performed by British rock band Mumford & Sons. Since forming in late 2007, the band have released four studio albums, three live albums, six studio extended plays (three collaborations), seven live extended plays and twenty-two singles. This list contains unreleased songs and cover versions played by the band.

Original songs

Covers

References

External links

Mumford